The women's cross country mountain biking competition at the 2006 Commonwealth Games took place on 23 March at Lysterfield Park.

Result

External links
 Results

Cycling at the 2006 Commonwealth Games
Mountain biking at the Commonwealth Games
Comm